Colonel Thomas Alderson Davis (June 29, 1873 – February 12, 1964) was the founder of two military schools in the United States.

Early life and education
Davis was born in Virginia and graduated from the University of Tennessee. Shortly after college he joined his father in the shoe business.

Military career
During the Spanish–American War he served as a Captain of the 6th US Volunteer Infantry, also known as the Sixth Immunes, which was mustered at Knoxville, Tennessee and saw service in Puerto Rico.

Military academies
In 1907 he founded the El Paso Military Academy in Texas. On November 23, 1910, he opened his second academy in Pacific Beach, CA, the San Diego Army and Navy Academy. In 1921 he became officially known as Colonel.

External links
Army and Navy Academy website armyandnavyacademy.org

American military personnel of the Spanish–American War
People from Virginia
United States Army officers
University of Tennessee alumni
University and college founders
1873 births
1964 deaths